Amidon may refer to:

People
 Charles F. Amidon, a United States District Judge of the United States District Court for the District of North Dakota
 Edna P. Amidon, chief of the Home Economics Education Service in the US Office of Education from 1938 to 1964
 George H. Amidon, a Vermont state commissioner of taxes and Vermont State Treasurer in U.S.
 Kim Amidon, an American radio personality
 Margaret Amidon, an American educator
 Roger Amidon, an early settler of the Massachusetts Bay Colony and a French Huguenot
 Sam Amidon, an American folk artist
 Stephen Amidon, an American author and critic

Other uses
 Amidon, North Dakota, county seat of Slope County, North Dakota
 Amidon, a trade name for methadone